Idiomarina fontislapidosi is a Gram-negative, strictly aerobic, chemoorganotrophic and motile  bacterium from the genus of Idiomarina which has been isolated from soil from Fuente de Piedra in Spain.

References

Bacteria described in 2004
Alteromonadales